Dingana is a butterfly genus from the subfamily Satyrinae in the family Nymphalidae.

Species
Dingana alaedeus Henning & Henning, 1984
Dingana alticola Henning & Henning, 1996
Dingana angusta Henning & Henning, 1996
Dingana bowkeri (Trimen, 1870)
Dingana clara (van Son, 1940)
Dingana clarki van Son, 1955
Dingana dingana (Trimen, 1873)
Dingana fraterna Henning & Henning, 1996
Dingana jerinae Henning & Henning, 1996
Dingana kammanassiensis Henning & Henning, 1994

External links 
 Dingana, at Markku Savela's Lepidoptera and Some Other Life Forms

Satyrini
Butterfly genera